Berytinus is a genus of stilt bugs in the family Berytidae. There are about 12 described species in Berytinus.

Species
These 12 species belong to the genus Berytinus:

 Berytinus clavipes Fabricius, 1775
 Berytinus consimilis (Horvath, 1885)
 Berytinus crassipes (Herrich-Schaeffer, 1835)
 Berytinus distinguendus (Ferrari, 1874)
 Berytinus geniculatus (Horvath, 1885)
 Berytinus hirticornis (Brulle, 1836)
 Berytinus minor (Herrich-Schaeffer, 1835)
 Berytinus montivagus (Meyer, 1841)
 Berytinus setipennis (Saunders, 1876)
 Berytinus signoreti (Fieber, 1859)
 Berytinus strangulatus (Rey, 1888)
 Berytinus striola (Ferrari, 1874)

References

Further reading

External links

 

Berytidae
Articles created by Qbugbot